Jagadeka Veeruni Katha is a 1961 Indian Telugu-language fantasy swashbuckler film, produced and directed by K. V. Reddy under the Vijaya Productions banner. It stars N. T. Rama Rao, B. Saroja Devi with music composed by Pendyala Nageswara Rao.

The film was subsequently dubbed into Tamil (Jagathalaprathapan), Kannada (Jagadekaveerana Kathe), Bengali, Oriya, and Hindi languages. Released on August 9, 1961, the film was a box office success.

Plot
Once upon a time, there was a kingdom Udayagiri, its king (Mukkamala) has two sons Pratap (N. T. Rama Rao) a valiant man and Jagajithu (Lanka Satyam), a poltroon man that envies his brother. Pratap's life ambition is to couple up with Devakanyas the angels Jayanthi/Indrakumari (B. Saroja Devi), Nagini/Nagakumari (L. Vijayalakshmi), Varuni/Varunakumari (Jayanthi), and Marichi/Agnikumari (Bala). Knowing it, the angered king ostracizes him from the country.

Right now, Pratap starts his adventurous journey towards the angels with the blessings of his mother (Rushyendramani). On the way, he becomes acquainted with a clown Rendu Chintalu (Relangi) who helps him to land at a pond wherein the angels bathe. Just as, Pratap secretly observes them when Jayanthi Indrakumari makes him a statue. Here, Goddess Parvathi (Kannamba) appears as an old woman and restores him. Thereupon, she reveals a secret of Jayanthi she has a curse to marry a person who steals her saree and she will stay on earth until he holds it. So, Pratap steals her saree which the goddess hides in his leg and proclaims not to hold with him to the battlefield.

At present, Pratap weds Jayanti and proceeds towards the Kamakura Kingdom where its king Threesoka (Rajanala), a debaucher, keeps a bad eye on Jayanthi. So he plots, with his wicked minister Badarayana Praggada (C. S. R) and embraces Pratap. Afterward, to discard they send him to Naga, Varuna, and Agni Lokas on the pretext of fetching medicine where Pratap knits the angels. After some time, Pratap ceases Threesoka and Badarayana and delegates the kingdom to Rendu Chintalu. Meanwhile, at Udayaagiri, Jagajithu conquers the kingdom and captivates his parents but somehow they abscond and reach their son.

Currently, Pratap moves to regain their kingdom when he frees the saree and asks his mother to safeguard it. Noticing, the angels acquire it by hoodwinking and leave to heaven. Being cognizant of it, Pratap becomes grief-stricken, after crossing many hurdles he lands in heaven where Indra (Mikkilineni) tests his efficiency and capability. Finally, Pratap succeeds in getting back his wives to Earth and rules his kingdom happily.

Cast

N. T. Rama Rao as Pratap
B. Saroja Devi as Jayanthi/Indra Kumari
Rajanala as Threesoka Maharaju 
Relangi as Renduchintalu 
C. S. R. as Badarayana Praggada
Mikkilineni as Indra
Mukkamala as Maharaju 
Vangara as Paata Mantri Buddisagar
Lanka Satyam as Jagajithu
Kannamba as Goddess Parvathi
Rushyendramani as Maharani
L. Vijayalakshmi as Nagini / Naga Kumari 
Girija as Ekaasa
Jayanthi as Varuni / Varuna Kumari
Bala as Mareechi / Agni Kumari
"Gemini" Chandra - Dancer

Production 
K. V. Reddy's next project after Pellilnati Pramanalu (1958) was the Vijaya Productions' fantasy film Jagadeka Veeruni Katha. The film was adapted from a popular Tamil folktale on which a previous film, Pakshiraja Films’ Jagathalapratapan (1944) was also based. Screenwriter Pingali and K. V. Reddy took the core plot from Jagathala Prathapan, but added new characters, made other changes to the story and prepared the script of Jagadeka Veeruni Katha which made it quite distinct from the 1944 film.

Soundtrack

Music composed by Pendyala Nageswara Rao. Lyrics were written by Pingali Nagendra Rao.

Box office
 The film has celebrated 100 days in 30 centres. The Centenary celebrations were held at Naaz theater in Guntur city. The film unit felicitated an individual who saw the movie 100 times. The film ran well even in each of the subsequent releases.

References

External links
 
  - a song from the Tamil dubbed version sung by Sirkazhi Govindarajan

1961 films
1960s Telugu-language films
Indian historical fantasy films
Films about royalty
Indian black-and-white films
Films directed by K. V. Reddy
Films scored by Pendyala Nageswara Rao
Indian swashbuckler films
1960s historical fantasy films